The Doring River  is a river in the Western Cape Province, South Africa. It is part of the Olifants/Doring River system.

The name 'Doring' is also applied to a stretch of the Sout River, another Olifants tributary, midway through its course.

Course
It originates northeast of Ceres and joins the Olifants River near the town of Klawer as the Oudrif River after the confluence with the Koebee River. Tributaries include the Tankwa River, Riet River, Wolf River and Brandewyn River.

Ecology
The Clanwilliam Yellowfish (Labeobarbus capensis), a local endemic species classified as Vulnerable by the IUCN, is still found in the Doring and other rivers of its basin.

See also
 List of reservoirs and dams in South Africa
 List of rivers of South Africa

References

External links
The Influence of Hydraulics, Hydrology and Temperature on the Distribution, Habitat, Use and Recruitment of Threatened Cyprinids in a Western Cape River, South Africa
 List of South African Dams from the Department of Water Affairs and Forestry (South Africa)

Rivers of the Western Cape